Thomas Miller McClintock II (born July 10, 1956) is an American politician serving as the U.S. representative for  since 2009 (known as the 4th congressional district until 2023). His district stretches from the Sacramento suburbs to the outer suburbs of Fresno; it includes Yosemite National Park. A member of the Republican Party, McClintock served as a California state assemblyman from 1982 to 1992 and from 1996 to 2000, when he became a California state senator, a position he held until 2008. He unsuccessfully ran for governor of California in the 2003 recall election and for lieutenant governor of California in the 2006 election.

Early life, education and early political career
McClintock was born in White Plains, New York, and graduated in 1978 from the University of California, Los Angeles (UCLA). At 23, he was elected chair of the Ventura County Republican Party, and served until 1981. He was chief of staff to State Senator Ed Davis from 1980 to 1982. From 1992 to 1994, he served as director of the Center for the California Taxpayer. He was director of the Claremont Institute's Golden State Center for Policy Studies from 1995 to 1996.

California politics

California Assembly (1982–1992, 1996–2000)
In 1982, at age 26, McClintock ran for California's 36th State Assembly district, then based in Thousand Oaks, after redistricting. He defeated Democrat Harriet Kosmo Henson 56–44%. He was reelected in 1984, defeating Tom Jolicoeur 72–28%. In 1986, he was reelected to a third term, defeating Frank Nekimken 73–25%. In 1988, he was reelected to a fourth term, defeating George Webb II 70–29%. In 1990, he was reelected to a fifth term, defeating Ginny Connell 59–36%.

After running for Congress in 1992 and for controller in 1994, McClintock ran for the Assembly again in 1996. He ran for California's 38th State Assembly district and defeated Democrat Jon Lauritzen 56–40% to win his sixth assembly term. In 1998, McClintock was reelected to a seventh term unopposed.

McClintock authored California's lethal injection use for California's death penalty law. He also opposed tax increases and supported spending cuts. He was a strong proponent of abolishing the car tax.

California Senate (2000–2008)
In 2000, McClintock retired from the California Assembly to run for California's 19th State Senate district. He ranked first in the May 7 open primary with 52% of the vote. In November, he defeated Democrat Daniel Gonzalez, 58–42%. He was reelected in 2004, defeating Paul Joseph Graber, 61–39%.

In 2008, McClintock voted against Proposition 2, which prohibits confining calves, pigs and hens in small cages in which they cannot extend their limbs. "Farm animals are food, not friends", he said in response to backlash to his vote. He also cited concern about increased grocery bills. In 2000, he was instrumental in proposing a two-thirds reduction in the vehicle license fee, or car tax. In 2003, he opposed then-Governor Gray Davis's attempt to rescind a rollback of a vehicle license fee. McClintock has also opposed deficit reduction efforts that would have increased taxes. He supported the Bureaucracy Reduction and Closure Commission and performance-based budgeting.

Other elections

1994 controller election

McClintock ran for California State Controller after incumbent Gray Davis retired. He won the Republican primary, defeating John Morris, 61–39%. In the general election, he lost to Kathleen Connell, former Special Assistant to Los Angeles Mayor Tom Bradley and Director of L.A. Housing Authority, 48–46%, with three other candidates receiving the other 6% of the vote.

2002 controller election

McClintock ran for controller again in 2002, facing Democratic nominee Steve Westly, an eBay executive. Westly outspent him 5-to-1. McClintock's campaigns focused on increasing accountability for the state budget. The ads featured the character Angus McClintock, a fictional cousin and fellow Scottish American extolling McClintock's thriftiness and accountability in low-budget 15-second ads. He lost by a margin of just 0.2%, or 16,811 votes, to Westley, who won with a plurality of 45.3% of the vote. Three other candidates received 9.5% of the vote.

2003 gubernatorial recall election

In 2003, McClintock ran in the recall election against Davis. Republican and film actor Arnold Schwarzenegger won the election with 49% of the vote. Democratic Lieutenant Governor Cruz Bustamante finished second with 31%. McClintock finished third with 14%. Together, Republicans Schwarzenegger and McClintock were supported by 5,363,778 Californians, or 62.1% of the vote. 132 other candidates received the remaining 6.4%.

McClintock performed the best in Stanislaus County, where he received 24% of the vote. He also cracked 20% or higher in several other counties: Mariposa (23%), Tuolumne (22%), Tehama (21%), Calaveras (20%), Madera (20%), Modoc (20%), Shasta (20%), San Joaquin (20%), and Ventura (20%).

2006 lieutenant gubernatorial election

McClintock ran for lieutenant governor in 2006. He defeated Tony Farmer in the Republican primary, 94–6%. In the general election, he lost to Democratic State Insurance Commissioner John Garamendi, 49–45%.

U.S. House of Representatives

Elections

1992
After redistricting, McClintock retired from the Assembly to challenge Democratic U.S. Representative Anthony C. Beilenson in California's 24th congressional district. He won the nine-candidate Republican primary with a plurality of 34% of the vote, beating second-place finisher Sang Korman by 11 points. Beilenson defeated McClintock, 56–39%.

2008

On March 4, 2008, McClintock announced his candidacy for the U.S. House of Representatives in California's 4th congressional district, about 300 miles north of the district McClintock represented in the state Senate. The district's nine-term incumbent, John Doolittle, was retiring. McClintock was unable to vote for himself in either the primary or the general election. Although for most of the year he lived in Elk Grove, a suburb of Sacramento within the 3rd district at the time, his legal residence was in Thousand Oaks, within the borders of his state senate district. The California Constitution requires state senators to maintain their legal residence in the district they represent.

Upon McClintock's entry into the race, fellow Republicans Rico Oller and Eric Egland withdrew from the primary and endorsed him. He was also endorsed by the Republican Liberty Caucus, the Club for Growth, and U.S. Representative Ron Paul. McClintock faced former U.S. Representative Doug Ose, a moderate who represented the neighboring 3rd District from 1999 to 2005. Like McClintock, Ose lived outside the district and was painted as a carpetbagger and a liberal who had voted to raise taxes and who voted for earmarks. McClintock defeated Ose, 54–39%.

The Democratic nominee was retired Air Force Lt. Col. Charlie Brown, who ran an unexpectedly strong race against Doolittle in 2006. In March 2008, Ose's campaign commercials criticized McClintock for receiving over $300,000 in per diem living expenses during his time in the state senate even though he lived in Elk Grove for most of the year. McClintock maintained that the payments were justified because his legal residence was in Thousand Oaks, in his district. He said, "Every legislator's [Sacramento area] residence is close to the Capitol. My residential costs up here are much greater than the average legislator because my family is here." Ose's campaign commercials argued McClintock did not own or rent a home in the 19th district, but claimed his mother's home in Thousand Oaks as his state senate district residence. These attacks prompted a response from McClintock's wife, Lori, who said McClintock stayed with his mother in order to care for her after she fell ill and after the death of her husband. McClintock ran ads attacking Brown's participation at a 2005 protest by Code Pink, a prominent antiwar group, and argued Brown supported gay marriage but not the troops in Iraq. He also portrayed Brown as a clone of Speaker Nancy Pelosi.

By November 23, McClintock led Brown by 1,566 votes (0.4% of the vote), 184,190 to 182,624. Subsequent returns expanded the margin slightly with the last returns coming in from El Dorado County shortly after Thanksgiving. On December 1, McClintock declared victory and Brown conceded on December 3. McClintock defeated Brown by a margin of 0.5%, or 1,800 votes. He prevailed by a 3,500-vote margin in Placer County, the district's largest county. Brown won three of the district's nine counties: Sierra (49.8%), Plumas (47.9%), and Nevada (42.3%). McClintock won mainly on the coattails from John McCain, who carried the 4th with 54% of the vote, his fifth-best total in the state.

2010

McClintock defeated Michael Babich in the Republican primary, Babich 78–22%. On November 2, he was reelected, defeating businessman Clint Curtis 61–31% and winning every county in the district.

2012

For his first two terms, McClintock represented a district covering the northeast corner of California, from the eastern suburbs of Sacramento to the Oregon border.

Redistricting after the 2010 census pushed the 4th well to the south. Only three counties remained from the old 4th: Nevada, Placer, and El Dorado. The redrawn district cut out the 4th's share of Sacramento County, including the part of Elk Grove that includes McClintock's home. Elk Grove is now entirely within the borders of the neighboring 7th District, represented by Democrat Ami Bera, making McClintock one of only a few members of Congress who live outside the district they represent. House members are constitutionally required only to live in the state they represent, but longstanding convention holds that they live in or reasonably close to their districts. McClintock said in 2016 that he intended to move his residence inside the redrawn 4th as soon as home prices rebounded enough for him to sell his Elk Grove home.

The reconfigured 4th was as strongly Republican as its predecessor, and McClintock was reelected to a third term, defeating Democrat Jack Uppal 61–39%. He won all but two of the district's ten counties: Nevada (37%) and Alpine (41%).

2014

McClintock was reelected, finishing first in California's "top two" primary and defeating moderate Republican challenger National Guard Major Art Moore in the general election, 60%–40%.

2016

McClintock again finished first in the primary and defeated Democrat Robert W. Derlet, a physician, environmentalist and retired UC Davis professor, in the general election, 63%–37%.

2018

McClintock defeated Democratic challenger Jessica Morse in the general election, receiving 184,401 votes to her 156,253 (54.1% to 45.9%).

Tenure
During the 112th Congress McClintock was one of 40 members of the Republican Study Committee who frequently voted against Republican Party leadership and vocally expressed displeasure with House bills. In 2011, he voted against the National Defense Authorization Act for Fiscal Year 2012 due to a provision that would allow the government and the military to indefinitely detain American citizens and others without trial. McClintock's chief of staff, Igor Birman, was a candidate for Congress in California's 7th congressional district in 2014.

In 2009, McClintock signed a pledge sponsored by Americans for Prosperity promising to vote against any global warming legislation that would raise taxes.

McClintock voted in favor of the Tax Cuts and Jobs Act of 2017. He voted against the first version of the bill, displeased with the removal of deductions related to medical expenses, student loan interest, and casualty loss. Those three items were addressed in the final version of the bill. McClintock said the bill would "restore American workers to an internationally competitive position." He expressed concern about the bill's impact on the budget deficit and anticipated that it would be addressed "by spending reforms this coming year."

In 2017, McClintock called for special prosecutor Robert Mueller to investigate President Donald Trump. McClintock felt that Trump's firing of James Comey justified a special prosecutor.

After Trump pulled 1,000 U.S. troops from Kurdish-held territory on the Syrian border south of Turkey in 2019, a bipartisan resolution passed the House, 354–60, that condemned him for abandoning those U.S. allies that would allow the Islamic State of Iraq and the Levant (ISIL) to reestablish and regroup its forces, and allow the Turks to attack the Kurds. McClintock was one of the two members of California's congressional delegation to vote against it.

In 2020, McClintock was the sole House Republican to cosponsor the Ending Qualified Immunity Act, which was proposed in response to the murder of George Floyd and resultant widespread protests. The act was introduced by Justin Amash and Ayanna Pressley and cosponsored by 62 House Democrats in addition to McClintock. Because Amash was a registered Libertarian as of the act's introduction in June 2020, McClintock's support technically made the act the first tripartisan piece of federal legislation in modern U.S. history.

As of October 2021, McClintock had voted in line with Joe Biden's stated position 5% of the time.

Legislation
McClintock supported the Water Rights Protection Act, a bill that would prevent federal agencies from requiring certain entities to relinquish their water rights to the United States in order to use public lands. The bill was a reaction to the United States Forest Service's decision to pursue a "new regulation to demand that water rights be transferred to the federal government as a condition for obtaining permits needed to operate 121 ski resorts that cross over federal lands." McClintock supported the bill, saying that the Forest Service's regulation "illustrates an increasingly hostile attitude by this agency toward those who make productive use of our vast national forests, in this case by enhancing and attracting the tourism upon which our mountain communities depend."

Committee assignments 
 Committee on the Judiciary
Subcommittee on the Constitution, Civil Rights and Civil Liberties
Subcommittee on Immigration and Citizenship (Chair)
 Committee on Natural Resources
Subcommittee on Indian and Alaska Native Affairs
 Subcommittee on Federal Lands
 Subcommittee on Water and Power

Caucus memberships 
 Congressional Arts Caucus
 Republican Study Committee
 Tea Party Caucus
 American Sikh Congressional Caucus
Congressional Constitution Caucus
Congressional Western Caucus
United States Congressional International Conservation Caucus
House Freedom Caucus (Formerly)

Political positions

2020 presidential election 
In December 2020, McClintock joined 125 other Republican members of Congress in signing an amicus brief in support of a lawsuit by the attorney general of the state of Texas that sought to overturn the certified results of the 2020 presidential election in four other U.S. states. The lawsuit was called a "seditious abuse of the judicial process" by the attorney general of Pennsylvania, and "simply madness" by 2012 Republican presidential nominee Mitt Romney.

House Speaker Nancy Pelosi issued a statement that called signing the amicus brief an act of "election subversion."

McClintock later became one of seven Republicans who did not support their colleagues' efforts to challenge the results of the election on January 6, 2021. These seven signed a letter that, while giving credence to election fraud allegations Trump made, said Congress did not have the authority to influence the election's outcome.

McClintock voted against impeaching Trump over his role in inciting the 2021 storming of the U.S. Capitol.

Animal rights 
McClintock has said that "farm animals are food, not friends."

Cannabis
In 2015, McClintock introduced an amendment to limit the enforcement of federal law in states that have legalized cannabis. Known as the McClintock–Polis amendment, it failed by a 206–222 vote. It was reintroduced in 2019 as the Blumenauer–McClintock–Norton amendment and passed 267–165.

In 2016, McClintock endorsed California's Proposition 64, the Adult Use of Marijuana Act. He stated: "Our current laws have failed us, and have created a violent and criminal black market that actively and aggressively markets to young people. Legalization takes the criminal profit out of the equation, and allows us to regulate marijuana the same way we currently regulate alcohol."

In 2020, McClintock was one of five House Republicans to vote for the Marijuana Opportunity Reinvestment and Expungement (MORE) Act to legalize cannabis at the federal level. In 2021, he was one of four original cosponsors of a Republican-led legalization bill named the States Reform Act.

COVID-19 
During the COVID-19 pandemic, McClintock expressed the view that wearing face masks should not be mandatory, and while wearing a mask during congressional sessions, said, "this mask is useless". During the second impeachment of Donald Trump, McClintock wore a mask that read "This mask is as useless as our governor", referring to Governor Gavin Newsom.

Defense 
In September 2021, McClintock was among 75 House Republicans to vote against the National Defense Authorization Act of 2022, which contains a provision that would require women to be drafted.

Environment 
McClintock questions the role that human activity plays in climate change, arguing that the "climate has been changing for four and a half billion years."

Foreign policy 
In 2019, McClintock was one of 60 representatives to vote against condemning Trump's withdrawal from Syria.

In 2020, McClintock voted against the National Defense Authorization Act of 2021, which would prevent the president from withdrawing soldiers from Afghanistan without congressional approval.

In June 2021, McClintock was one of 49 House Republicans to vote to repeal the AUMF against Iraq.

In July 2021, McClintock was one of five House Republicans to vote against a bill that allocates $2.1 billion for Afghan visas and Capitol Hill security.

In 2023, McClintock was among 47 Republicans to vote in favor of H.Con.Res. 21 which directed President Joe Biden to remove U.S. troops from Syria within 180 days.

Human and civil rights

McClintock opposes same-sex marriage. In 2008, he said, "calling a homosexual partnership a marriage doesn't make it one."

In June 2021, McClintock was one of 14 House Republicans to vote against legislation to establish June 19, or Juneteenth, as a federal holiday.

Immigration
McClintock voted against the Fairness for High-Skilled Immigrants Act of 2019 which would amend the Immigration and Nationality Act to eliminate the per-country numerical limitation for employment-based immigrants, to increase the per-country numerical limitation for family-sponsored immigrants, and for other purposes.

McClintock voted against the Further Consolidated Appropriations Act of 2020 which authorizes DHS to nearly double the available H-2B visas for the remainder of FY 2020.

McClintock voted against Consolidated Appropriations Act (H.R. 1158) which effectively prohibits ICE from cooperating with Health and Human Services to detain or remove illegal alien sponsors of unaccompanied alien children (UACs).

Voting rights 
McClintock opposes mail-in voting, saying in 2020 that it was a "corrupted process" that allows ballots to be sent to voters who have died or moved away.

Personal life
McClintock lives in the Sacramento area and Thousand Oaks. He was married to Lori McClintock until her death in December 2021, from dehydration due to gastroenteritis caused, according to a coroner's report, by "adverse effects of white mulberry leaf ingestion". McClintock is a Baptist.

Electoral history

''For a complete list of all candidates who participated in the 2003 recall election, see 2003 California gubernatorial recall election.

References

External links 
Congressman Tom McClintock official U.S. House website
Tom McClintock for Congress

Join California Tom McClintock
Statements
Video Response to President Calderon

|-

|-

|-

|-

|-

|-

|-

1956 births
20th-century American politicians
21st-century American politicians
American nationalists
Baptists from California
Baptists from the United States
Candidates in the 1994 United States elections
Candidates in the 2002 United States elections
Candidates in the 2006 United States elections
Republican Party California state senators
Living people
Republican Party members of the California State Assembly
People from Elk Grove, California
People from Thousand Oaks, California
People from White Plains, New York
Protestants from California
Republican Party members of the United States House of Representatives from California
Tea Party movement activists
University of California, Los Angeles alumni